The Japanese manga series Bartender was written by Araki Joh and illustrated by Kenji Nagatomo. It was first published in Shueisha's magazine Super Jump between May 2004 and September 2011, and in Grand Jump from November and December 2011. The chapters were collected and published into twenty-one tankōbon volumes by Shueisha starting on December 3, 2004, with the last volume being released on February 17, 2012. The manga has also been licensed in South Korea by Haksan Publishing, and in Taiwan by Sharp Point Press.

Three spin-off series, written by Joh and illustrated by Osamu Kajisa, were produced. The first, titled Bartender à Paris, started to be serialized in Grand Jump on January 4, 2012. It was collected into six volumes; the first was published on June 19, 2012, and the last on December 19, 2013. On November 6, 2013, a follow-up, Bartender à Tokyo, commenced to be serialized in the same magazine. Its eight collected volumes were published in Japan between April 18, 2014, and October 19, 2016. Both Bartender à Paris and Bartender à Tokyo were licensed in South Korea by Haksan Publishing and in Taiwan by Sharp Point Press. The third spin-off, Bartender 6stp, started on Grand Jump Premium on August 24, 2016. The latter first volume was published on March 17, 2017, while the last and fourth volume was released on February 19, 2020.

Volume list

Bartender

Bartender à Paris

Bartender à Tokyo

Bartender 6stp

References

Bartender (manga)
Bartender